The InterACT Disability Arts Festival is an annual three-day event which showcases the talents of disabled performers, authors, artists, and artisans in Auckland, New Zealand. The event has been described by the Minister for Disability Issues, Tariana Turia, as "a chance for people of all abilities to celebrate and share their talents with us all"

History
The festival was inspired by the Awakenings Festival of Horsham, Victoria, Australia. It wasn't until five years after a visit to the 2007 Awakenings festival by three representatives of the Interacting Theatre Company, that the inaugural InterACT festival was held in Auckland, New Zealand.

The 2013 edition of the festival is scheduled for 23–25 October and the venue will be Corban's Estate Arts Centre, Henderson.

See also 
Disability art
Disability in the arts

References

External links 

Objective 9: Support lifestyle choices, recreation and culture for disabled people

Festivals in Auckland
Disability in the arts
Arts festivals in New Zealand
Disability organisations based in New Zealand
West Auckland, New Zealand